Matthew Greenhalgh is an English screenwriter from Manchester, England. He is best known for writing the screenplay to the film Film Stars Don't Die in Liverpool, which earned him a BAFTA Award nomination Best Adapted Screenplay.

Early life and education 
Greenhalgh was born in Salford in the Greater Manchester area of England, to Philip Greenhalgh and Rita Greenhalgh (née Roberts). He grew up in Prestwich in North Manchester.

Greenhalgh graduated from St Bede's College, Manchester and Loreto College, Manchester. He attended Warrington Collegiate Institute with a focus in media studies. He graduated from the University of Chester where he studied print media.

Career 
Greenhalgh started out writing reviews for the Manchester magazine, City Life.

Greenhalgh got his start working in television on the Channel 4 TV series Hollyoaks and Brookside as a runner. From 1999 to 2000, he worked as an assistant director on the British TV show, Queer as Folk. He was first assistant director on the 2000 TV show, Fat Friends, and on 2001's Clocking Off.

In 2002, Greenhalgh wrote for the BBC TV series, Clocking Off. In 2003, he wrote one of the 90 minute episodes of the last series of the ITV series, Cold Feet. He worked as a writer and director on series 1 and 2 of the BBC3 series, the Mancunian Burn It, and then as a writer and director on the Channel 4 series, Legless.

Greenhalgh's film writing debut was a biopic of Joy Division frontman Ian Curtis, the 2007 film Control, which was directed by Anton Corbijn. He was awarded the Carl Foreman BAFTA award at the 61st British Academy Film Awards, and was nominated for Best Screenplay at the British Independent Film Award for his work on the film. Control was adapted from the book, Touching From a Distance, written by Ian Curtis' wife, Deborah Curtis.

Greenhalgh wrote the 2009 film Nowhere Boy, about a young John Lennon, which was directed by Sam Taylor Wood and starred Aaron Johnson. The film was nominated for a BAFTA and a BIFA for Best Screenplay.

In 2010, Greenhalgh wrote and directed the short film, Acid Burn, which starred Agyness Deyn and Matthew Beard. In 2011, he wrote the script for the short film, Supermarket Girl, which starred Matthew Beard and Nichola Burley.

He wrote the screenplay for the 2013's The Look of Love, a film about the famous British pornographer Paul Raymond, directed by Michael Winterbottom and starring Steve Coogan and Anna Friel which premiered in Sundance Film Festival 2013 and Berlin Film Festival 2013.

Greenhalgh wrote the 2017 Paul McGuigan film, Film Stars Don't Die in Liverpool, starring Annette Bening, Jamie Bell and Julie Walters. was nominated for BAFTA Award for Best Adapted Screenplay.

In July 2022, it was announced that the feature film Back to Black, based on the life and career of late singer Amy Winehouse had been scripted by Greenhalgh, with Sam Taylor-Johnson directing the movie.

Personal life 
Greenhalgh is married to British television producer Nicola Shindler, with whom he has two daughters and a son.

Awards 
 2003: BAFTA TV Award, Best New Writer (nomination) for Clocking Off
 2007: British Independent Film Award, Best Screenplay (nomination) for Control
 2007: Chicago International Film Festival, Silver Hugo Award, Best Screenplay for Control
 2008: BAFTA Awards, Carl Foreman Award for the Most Promising Newcomer for Control
 2008: BAFTA Awards, Alexander Korda Award for Best British Film (nomination) for Control – with Orian Williams, Todd Eckert, Anton Corbijn 
 2008: Evening Standard British Film Awards, Best Screenplay for Control
 2008: London Critics Circle Film Awards, ALFS Award, British Breakthrough – Filmmaking for Control
 2009: British Independent Film Award, Best Screenplay (nomination) for Nowhere Boy
 2010: BAFTA Awards, Alexander Korda Award for Best British Film (nomination) for Nowhere Boy with Kevin Loader, Douglas Rae, Robert Bernstein, Sam Taylor-Johnson 
 2018:	BAFTA Film Award, Best Screenplay (Adapted) (nomination) for Film Stars Don't Die in Liverpool

Filmography 
 1999-2000: Queer as Folk (TV Series) – Third Assistant Director (8 episodes); First Assistant Director (2 episodes)
 2000: Fat Friends (TV Series) – First Assistant Director (3 episodes) 
 2001: Clocking Off (TV Series) – First Assistant Director (1 episode); Written by (1 episode) 
 2003: Cold Feet (TV Series) – Written by (1 episode) 
 2003: Burn It (TV Series) – Written by (15 episodes) 
 2005: Legless (TV Movie) – Writer, Director 
 2007: Control – Screenplay 
 2009: Nowhere Boy – Screenplay 
 2010: Acid Burn (Short) – Writer, Director
 2011: Supermarket Girl (Short) – Director
 2012: Move On – Writer
 2013: The Look of Love – Written by 
 2017: Film Stars Don't Die in Liverpool – Screenplay
 TBA: Back to Black — Screenplay

Selected works and publications

References

External links 
 Matt Greenhalgh at [official website]
 
 Matt Greenhalgh at British Film Institute

1972 births
Living people
Alumni of the University of Chester
English male screenwriters
English screenwriters
Outstanding Debut by a British Writer, Director or Producer BAFTA Award winners
Place of birth missing (living people)